Van Allen may refer to:

People

Given name
 Van Allen Plexico (born 1968), U.S. professor

Surname
 George Van Allen (1890–1937), politician in Alberta, Canada
 James Van Allen (1914–2006), American space scientist
 John Delbert Van Allen (1850–1928), retail dry goods merchant and department store owner
 Mark van Allen (born 1954), American musician
 Shaun Van Allen (born 1967), former hockey player
 Van Allen Plexico (born 1968), science fiction and fantasy author

Places
 Van Allen Range, a mountain range in Oates Land, Antarctica
 Van Allen Building, Clinton, Iowa, US
 Van Allen Hall, University of Iowa
 Van Allen House, Oakland, Bergen, New Jersey, US

Other uses
 Van Allen radiation belt, a torus of energetic charged particles around Earth
 Van Allen Probes, two robotic NASA spacecraft

See also

 Van Allen Belt (band), a Canadian rock band
 
 Allen (disambiguation)
 Van Alen (disambiguation)
 Van Halen (disambiguation)

Surnames of Dutch origin